Fatal Error is a 1999 TBS TV-movie starring Janine Turner and Antonio Sabàto Jr. based on Ben Mezrich's 1998 novel Reaper.

It also stars Robert Wagner, Malcolm Stewart and Catherine Lough Haggquist.

Reception
David Kronke of Variety said, "TBS' maiden entry into original filmmaking, "Fatal Error," is a diverting enough cautionary technophobic thriller pointedly commenting on the ossifying effects of addiction to TV and computers, even if the filmmakers don't exploit the satire particularly well." Earl Cressey of DVD Talk said, "Fatal Error starts off fairly decent, but soon delves into the regular rut of most made for TV films: it becomes predictable and clichéd. It almost seems like The X-Files gone bad."

References

External links

1999 television films
1999 films
Films based on American novels
American science fiction television films
TBS original films
Films directed by Armand Mastroianni
1990s American films